Aureispira is a Gram-negative and aerobic genus from the family of Saprospiraceae.
Aureispira gets its energy from a process called ixotrophy which allows it to attack different cells.(Furusawa et al.)

References

Further reading 

 
 
 

Bacteroidota
Bacteria genera